Ellis Field may refer to:
Monticello Municipal Airport (Arkansas), also known as Ellis Field
Ellis Field (Texas A&M), the soccer stadium at Texas A&M University